James S. Marshall was the 11th Mayor of Green Bay, Wisconsin.

Biography
Marshall was born on March 22, 1819, in Poultney, Vermont, one of five children born to Stranis and Mabel Marshall. As a young man, he moved to St. Louis, Missouri, and opened a boot and shoe store.

In 1857, he moved to Green Bay, Wisconsin, and continued his boot and shoe business.  He later went into the lumber business in partnership with his brother, Linus M. Marshall.

Marshall was elected to a one-year term as Mayor of Green Bay in the spring 1867 election.

Family and personal life

James S. Marshall married Harriet K. Bailey on November 23, 1862. They had four daughters together.

Marshall died on April 2, 1892.

References

People from Poultney (town), Vermont
Politicians from St. Louis
Mayors of Green Bay, Wisconsin
1819 births
1892 deaths
19th-century American politicians